Turbo 919 is the debut album from producer Sean Garrett. It is his first album as a singer and includes collaborations with Ludacris, Lil Wayne, Akon, and Pharrell. Two songs were released as singles, "Grippin'" and a remix of "6 In the Morning" featuring Rick Ross; neither single charted.

Track listing

Release history

Charts

References

2007 debut albums
Albums produced by Bloodshy & Avant
Albums produced by Rodney Jerkins
Albums produced by Sean Garrett
Albums produced by Pharrell Williams
Albums produced by Stargate
Interscope Records albums